Dora's Green is a hamlet in the Hart District of Hampshire, England. The hamlet lies near the A287 road between Farnham and Odiham on the Hampshire-Surrey border. Its nearest town is Farnham, approximately 2 miles (3 km) south-east.

Villages in Hampshire